The white-lipped keelback (Hebius leucomystax)  is a species of nonvenomous natricine snake found in central  Vietnam, Cambodia, and Laos.

Etymology
The specific name, leucomystax, is Greek for "white mustache''.

Biology
This snake, though primarily an upland species, is associated with both lowland and montane evergreen monsoon forests. It can be found near streams in mixed dipterocarp and pine forests. More rarely, it has been found in secondary forest. Its diet includes frogs and other small animals.

Description
It has a beautiful yellow-white stripe that sweeps along its head, and red dots cover its body.

References

External links 

Hebius
Reptiles of Cambodia
Reptiles of Laos
Reptiles of Vietnam
Reptiles described in 2007
Snakes of Vietnam
Snakes of Asia